Vedpal Tyagi (28 December 1915 – 30 October 1979), alternatively Ved Pal Tyagi, was an Indian judge who was the acting Governor of Rajasthan, serving from 15 February 1977 to 11 May 1977. He was appointed to the role, following the resignation of Jogendra Singh Before becoming a judge Justice Tyagi was a cabinet minister and was holding two portfolios of law and rehabilitation. He later became leader of opposition also. After retirement he was appointed the Vice chancellor of Rajasthan university. Tyagi died on 30 October 1979, at the age of 63.

References

1915 births
1979 deaths
Governors of Rajasthan